Michel Choquette (born March 14, 1938) is a Canadian humorist who has written for print, for television and for film, and a comedian who has performed for television.

Life and career
Choquette was born March 14, 1938, in Montreal, Quebec to a French Canadian family.

He attended Selwyn House School and did his undergraduate studies at Sir George Williams University. Afterwards, he studied for a master's degree in archaeology at the University of Pennsylvania, but did not graduate.

In 1959 he created a record called "Songs of Murray Bay", which made fun of a summer resort town on the St. Lawrence which was widely popular locally. Because of this song, Choquette, at age 22, caught the interest of Cambridge-based musical satirist Tom Lehrer.

Along with Peter Elbling, Choquette was half of the comedy duo "The Times Square Two" from 1964 to 1970.

Choquette wrote for the Harvard Lampoon, and for National Lampoon magazine, where he was a Contributing Editor from 1970 to 1971, an Associate Editor during 1972, and a Contributing Editor from 1973 to 1974.

During the 1970s, Choquette put together The Someday Funnies, a large collection of original comics about the 1960s that were created especially for the book by 169 writers and artists. The book was released by Abrams on November 1, 2011.

Choquette presently teaches screenwriting, comedy writing and creative writing at McGill University and Concordia University in Montreal.

Further reading

Journals
 LEVIN, Bob, August 2009, The Comics Journal, 299, "How Michel Choquette (Almost) Assembled the Most Stupendous Comic Book in the World"

Books
 KARP, Josh, 2004 Chicago Review Press, A Futile and Stupid Gesture
 SIMMONS, Matty, 1994, Barricade Books, If You Don't Buy This Book We'll Kill This Dog
 HENDRA, Tony, 1987, Dolphin Doubleday, Going Too Far

References

External links
 http://www.fedge.net/sharyflenniken/biography.html Shary Flenniken

1938 births
Canadian humorists
Canadian male screenwriters
Academic staff of Concordia University
The Harvard Lampoon alumni
Living people
Academic staff of McGill University
Comedians from Montreal
Writers from Montreal
Sir George Williams University alumni
University of Pennsylvania alumni